The Western Derby is the name given to the Australian rules football match between the West Coast Eagles and the Fremantle Dockers, who both participate in the Australian Football League (AFL). As both teams are based in Perth, the capital city of Western Australia, the term "derby" is used to describe the match.  It has become one of the most important matches for football in Western Australia, with former  and West Coast player, and former West Coast coach John Worsfold claiming that in the week before a derby that it is the main topic in Perth.

In 2004, during the 175th-anniversary celebrations of the establishment of the Swan River Colony, the Western Derby was named as one of 12 "Heritage Icons", in recognition of "football's key social and historical importance to the State".

Referring to a melee during the Round 21, 2000, Derby, Channel Nine sports reporter Michael Thomson said the match had divided Western Australia and the "football landscape in WA has been changed forever."

There are two Western Derbies every year during the home and away season. From 1995 until 2017 the derbies were held at Subiaco Oval. From 2018, all derbies will be held at Perth Stadium. There has never been a Western Derby finals match. There has been one edition held overseas – in October 2005 at The Oval in London.

West Coast were the dominant team during Fremantle's early years winning the first nine derbies. Fremantle won their first Western Derby in July 1999. Fremantle are the current holders of the Western Derby Trophy after defeating West Coast by 24 points in Round 22
of the 2022 AFL season.

The player adjudged best on ground in each derby match is awarded the Glendinning–Allan Medal, named after the inaugural captains of the clubs Ross Glendinning (West Coast) and Ben Allan (Fremantle). 

To this date there has never been a drawn derby.

Notable derbies

Derby XII Round 21, 2000. (AKA The Demolition Derby)

An infamous derby occurred in Round 21, 2000.  Both clubs were out of finals contention, the derby earlier in the year had recorded the biggest ever margin—(Scott Cummings' 10 goals led West Coast to a 117-point win), and in the lead-up both teams were talking down the importance of the game with the standard line of "it's only worth four points".  However, Clive Waterhouse indicated that something different might happen by saying that "blood would be spilled".

Before the first bounce, West Coast, through Michael Gardiner, went on the attack, pushing and shoving first-year player Matthew Pavlich.  The umpires awarded a free kick to Pavlich before the ball was bounced.  However, West Coast settled and led by four goals at quarter time with goals to Phillip Read, Andrew Embley and three to Phil Matera.  Fremantle's forward line was struggling, with only four goals to half time, including two to Waterhouse, and singles to midfielders Heath Black and Troy Cook, while two goals to Mitchell White, a fourth goal for Matera and one to Chad Morrison in the second quarter saw West Coast go to the half-time break 32 points in front. During the break, a brawl broke out which cleared both teams' benches and resulted in one of longest tribunal records in recent times.

In the third quarter, Phil Matera kicked his fifth goal, bringing the Eagles lead to 42 points, but Fremantle surged to cut the margin to 18 points at three-quarter time with three goals to Clive Waterhouse and singles to Pavlich and Daniel Bandy.

The last quarter saw Phil Matera carried from the ground on a stretcher after a hard collision with umpire Steve Hanley, and a solid but legal shirtfront by Troy Cook also saw Mitchell White carried from the ground on a stretcher.  A six-goal to three final quarter, including another two to Waterhouse and singles to Koops, Shipp, and Kickett and Dodd saw Fremantle hit the lead by two points.  With only seconds to spare the Eagles pushed forward and a loose ball was unable to be gathered in by makeshift forward Darren Glass, resulting in a rushed behind and a one-point victory for Fremantle, only their second ever in a Western Derby.

The following suspensions and fines were handed out as a result of the brawl:
 Dale Kickett was suspended for a total of nine matches for striking Phillip Read twice and striking Andrew Embley once.
 Michael Gardiner was suspended for two matches for striking Matthew Pavlich.
 Brad Dodd was suspended for two matches for attempting to strike Phillip Read, while Read was suspended for two matches for striking Dodd in retaliation.
 Seven players from Fremantle (Heath Black, Paul Hasleby, Shaun McManus, Clem Michael, Jason Norrish, Jess Sinclair and Andrew Shipp) and five players from West Coast (Ben Cousins, Andrew Embley, Kane Munro, Michael Gardiner and Phillip Read) were reported for melee involvement. Embley was found not guilty; the remaining players were fined between $2000 and $4000.

The following week both teams were well beaten, with Fremantle beaten by Brisbane by 107 points at the Gabba and Melbourne winning by 70 points over the Eagles at Subiaco.

London Derby, 2005

The only time the fixture was played outside of Perth was in October 2005 at The Oval in Kennington, South London. West Coast had narrowly finished as runner-up to Sydney the previous month but were missing their vaunted midfield of Cousins, Chris Judd and Daniel Kerr. The game included a third-quarter fight and the Dockers' Jeff Farmer and the Eagles' Adam Hunter kicking four goals each. No video footage has been shared from the game, which Fremantle won by 13.12 (90) to 11.7 (73) in front of nearly 19,000 people, which was a record crowd for an Australian rules football game in England.

Derby XXV Round 3, 2007

TheRound 3, 2007, match will be remembered as one of the most controversial and spiteful derbies ever played. Nearing three-quarter time, Fremantle's Des Headland was reported by umpire Stuart Wenn for striking and wrestling with West Coast's Adam Selwood, who made an inappropriate comment about a tattoo on Headland's arm, which depicted his then six-year-old daughter.

The case was heard on 18 April, with Selwood cleared of using abusive language towards Headland. Headland was found guilty of both striking and wrestling with Selwood, but was not suspended because of "exceptional and compelling circumstances by way of provocation".

West Coast won this match by 31 points, and Michael Braun was awarded the Ross Glendinning Medal, ending his acceptance speech with "Let's have a fucking good year" which was broadcast to 550,000 viewers on live television and to the 42,551 in attendance. Braun was fined $500 by the Eagles, but the AFL intervened, severely reprimanded the Eagles, and fined Braun an additional $5,000.

Several weeks after the match, Selwood officially apologised to women, and claimed that he did not mean what he had said to Headland four weeks earlier. Paradoxically, he also claimed that he was badly treated by the media because he was innocent of the charges in the Headland saga and he should have just been allowed to prove his innocence.

Source: AFL Tables

Derby XXXIV Round 18, 2011
The closest finish to a derby occurred in Round 18, 2011, when Eagles midfielder Matt Rosa was penalised by umpire Dean Margetts in a deliberate out of bounds decision with West Coast leading by two points in the dying seconds. Having earned a free kick from the decision, Hayden Ballantyne had a chance to win the game for Fremantle with a shot after the siren from 50m out on a tight angle and while his drop punt looked a goal for much of its journey, it hit the padding on the right hand goalpost amid a sea of hands from both sides, leaving the Eagles the winners by a single point, 8.17 (65) to Fremantle's 9.10 (64). Ballantyne prematurely celebrated, believing that the kick was a goal and had won the match.

This proved to be the catalyst for both sides as the season wound down. Fremantle slid down the ladder, losing the next six matches in succession to end a disappointing season, while West Coast went on to win their remaining regular season matches.

Derby XLVIII Round 20, 2018
Nearly two decades after the most violent derby in its history, another infamous contest occurred in Round 20, 2018. During the third quarter, West Coast midfielder Andrew Gaff struck Fremantle first-year player Andrew Brayshaw in the face in an incident which occurred off the ball and resulted in Brayshaw suffering a broken jaw. Gaff was targeted by Fremantle players for the remainder of the game, until his coach decided to bench him after suffering from a double-team shoulder hit from two Fremantle players. Gaff was sent straight to the AFL Tribunal the following day, where he pleaded guilty to intentionally striking Brayshaw, and subsequently suspended for eight AFL matches, thus missing the AFL finals where West Coast would go on to win the Premiership.

Derby LI 2020

For the first time, due to the 2020 COVID-19 pandemic reducing the season to 17 games, only a single derby was played in 2020. The ground capacity was restricted to half of the maximum to allow for social distancing. The crowd of 25,306 people was the highest for the AFL since the pandemic started, but the lowest ever for a ticketed derby. West Coast won by 30 points, setting a new record of ten consecutive derby wins dating back to August 2015.

Western Derby results

|- style="background:#ccf;font-size: 87%"
| 
| Year
| Date
| 
| Home Team
| 
| Away Team
| 
| Ground
| width=45 | Crowd
| Result/Winner
|
||
|- style="background:#fff;font-size: 87%;"
| 1
| rowspan="2" style="text-align: center;"|1995
| 14 May
| 7
|style="background:#ccffcc;"|  West Coast
|style="background:#ccffcc;"| 23.13 (151)
|  Fremantle
| 9.12 (66)
| rowspan="46"| Subiaco Oval
| 40,356
|bgcolor="#0014A8" div style="text-align: center;"|
!85
|bgcolor="#0014A8" div style="text-align: center;"|
|- style="background:#fff;font-size: 87%;"
| 2
| 3 September
| 22
|  Fremantle
| 8.10 (58)
|style="background:#ccffcc;"|  West Coast
|style="background:#ccffcc;"| 16.15 (111)
| 39,844
|bgcolor="#0014A8" div style="text-align: center;"|
!53
|bgcolor="#0014A8" div style="text-align: center;"|
|- style="background:#fff;font-size: 87%;"
| 3
| rowspan="2" style="text-align: center;"|1996
| 31 March
| 1
|  Fremantle
| 6.9 (45)
|style="background:#ccffcc;"|  West Coast
|style="background:#ccffcc;"| 9.13 (67)
| 33,041
|bgcolor="#0014A8" div style="text-align: center;"|
!22
|bgcolor="#0014A8" div style="text-align: center;"|
|- style="background:#fff;font-size: 87%;"
| 4
| 21 July
| 16
|style="background:#ccffcc;"|  West Coast
|style="background:#ccffcc;"| 12.10 (82)
|  Fremantle
| 7.6 (48)
| 35,406
|bgcolor="#0014A8" div style="text-align: center;"|
!34
|bgcolor="#0014A8" div style="text-align: center;"|
|- style="background:#fff;font-size: 87%;"
| 5
| rowspan="2" style="text-align: center;"|1997
| 13 April
| 3
|style="background:#ccffcc;"|  West Coast
|style="background:#ccffcc;"| 16.15 (111)
|  Fremantle
| 9.17 (71)
| 39,294
|bgcolor="#0014A8" div style="text-align: center;"|
!40
|bgcolor="#0014A8" div style="text-align: center;"|
|- style="background:#fff;font-size: 87%;"
| 6
| 3 August
| 18
|  Fremantle
| 7.7 (49)
|style="background:#ccffcc;"|  West Coast
|style="background:#ccffcc;"| 13.4 (82)
| 39,711
|bgcolor="#0014A8" div style="text-align: center;"|
!33
|bgcolor="#0014A8" div style="text-align: center;"|
|- style="background:#fff;font-size: 87%;"
| 7
| rowspan="2" style="text-align: center;"|1998
| 12 April
| 3
|  Fremantle
| 10.7 (67)
|style="background:#ccffcc;"|  West Coast
|style="background:#ccffcc;"| 14.10 (94)
| 34,710
|bgcolor="#0014A8" div style="text-align: center;"|
!27
|bgcolor="#0014A8" div style="text-align: center;"|
|- style="background:#fff;font-size: 87%;"
| 8
| 2 August
| 18
|style="background:#ccffcc;"|  West Coast
|style="background:#ccffcc;"| 15.9 (99)
|  Fremantle
| 8.12 (60)
| 37,145
|bgcolor="#0014A8" div style="text-align: center;"|
!39
|bgcolor="#0014A8" div style="text-align: center;"|
|- style="background:#fff;font-size: 87%;"
| 9
| rowspan="2" style="text-align: center;"|1999
| 28 March
| 1
|  Fremantle
| 13.20 (98)
|style="background:#ccffcc;"|  West Coast
|style="background:#ccffcc;"| 15.12 (102)
| 32,680
|bgcolor="#0014A8" div style="text-align: center;"|
!4
|bgcolor="#0014A8" div style="text-align: center;"|
|- style="background:#fff;font-size: 87%;"
| 10
| 18 July
| 16
|  West Coast
| 11.6 (72)
|style="background:#ccffcc;"|  Fremantle
|style="background:#ccffcc;"| 17.17 (119)
| 36,763
|bgcolor="#52007A" div style="text-align: center;"|
!47
|bgcolor="#0014A8" div style="text-align: center;"|
|- style="background:#fff;font-size: 87%;"
| 11
| rowspan="2" style="text-align: center;"|2000
| 15 April
| 6
|style="background:#ccffcc;"| 
 West Coast
|style="background:#ccffcc;"| 28.10 (178)
|  Fremantle
| 9.7 (61)
| 40,460
|bgcolor="#0014A8" div style="text-align: center;"|
|bgcolor="gold"|117
|bgcolor="#0014A8" div style="text-align: center;"|
|- style="background:#fff;font-size: 87%;"
| 12
| 30 July
| 21
|style="background:#ccffcc;"|  Fremantle
|style="background:#ccffcc;"| 15.11 (101)
|  West Coast
| 15.10 (100)
| 37,573
|bgcolor="#52007A" div style="text-align: center;"|
!1
|bgcolor="#0014A8" div style="text-align: center;"|
|- style="background:#fff;font-size: 87%;"
| 13
| rowspan="2" style="text-align: center;"|2001
| 21 April
| 4
|  Fremantle
| 13.10 (88)
|style="background:#ccffcc;"|  West Coast
|style="background:#ccffcc;"| 16.16 (112)
| 38,804
|bgcolor="#0014A8" div style="text-align: center;"|
!24
|bgcolor="#0014A8" div style="text-align: center;"|
|- style="background:#fff;font-size: 87%;"
| 14
| 12 August
| 19
|style="background:#ccffcc;"|  West Coast
|style="background:#ccffcc;"| 14.14 (98)
|  Fremantle
| 9.10 (64)
| 41,285
|bgcolor="#0014A8" div style="text-align: center;"|
!34
|bgcolor="#0014A8" div style="text-align: center;"|
|- style="background:#fff;font-size: 87%;"
| 15
| rowspan="2" style="text-align: center;"|2002
| 31 March
| 1
|style="background:#ccffcc;"|  West Coast
|style="background:#ccffcc;"| 21.11 (137)
|  Fremantle
| 18.10 (118)
| 39,467
|bgcolor="#0014A8" div style="text-align: center;"|
!19
|bgcolor="#0014A8" div style="text-align: center;"|
|- style="background:#fff;font-size: 87%;"
| 16
| 20 July
| 16
|style="background:#ccffcc;"|  Fremantle
|style="background:#ccffcc;"| 15.10 (100)
|  West Coast
| 11.4 (70)
| 41,779
|bgcolor="#52007A" div style="text-align: center;"|
!30
|bgcolor="#0014A8" div style="text-align: center;"|
|- style="background:#fff;font-size: 87%;"
| 17
| rowspan="2" style="text-align: center;"|2003
| 27 April
| 5
|  Fremantle
| 10.13 (73)
|style="background:#ccffcc;"|  West Coast
| 16.12 (108)
| 41,654
|bgcolor="#0014A8" div style="text-align: center;"|
!35
|bgcolor="#0014A8" div style="text-align: center;"|
|- style="background:#fff;font-size: 87%;"
| 18
| 30 August
| 22
|  West Coast
| 11.16 (82)
|style="background:#ccffcc;"|  Fremantle
|style="background:#ccffcc;"| 14.12 (96)
| 43,027
|bgcolor="#52007A" div style="text-align: center;"|
!14
|bgcolor="#0014A8" div style="text-align: center;"|
|- style="background:#fff;font-size: 87%;"
| 19
| rowspan="2" style="text-align: center;"|2004
| 1 May
| 6
|  West Coast
| 11.7 (73)
|style="background:#ccffcc;"|  Fremantle
|style="background:#ccffcc;"| 12.11 (83)
| 42,135
|bgcolor="#52007A" div style="text-align: center;"|
!10
|bgcolor="#0014A8" div style="text-align: center;"|
|- style="background:#fff;font-size: 87%;"
| 20
| 22 August
| 21
|  Fremantle
| 6.9 (45)
|style="background:#ccffcc;"|  West Coast
|style="background:#ccffcc;"| 13.15 (93)
| 41,907
|bgcolor="#0014A8" div style="text-align: center;"|
!48
|bgcolor="#0014A8" div style="text-align: center;"|
|- style="background:#fff;font-size: 87%;"
| 21
| rowspan="2" style="text-align: center;"|2005
| 9 April
| 3
|  Fremantle
| 12.8 (80)
|style="background:#ccffcc;"|  West Coast
|style="background:#ccffcc;"| 12.16 (88)
| 42,027
|bgcolor="#0014A8" div style="text-align: center;"|
!8
|bgcolor="#0014A8" div style="text-align: center;"|
|- style="background:#fff;font-size: 87%;"
| 22
| 12 August
| 20
|style="background:#ccffcc;"|  West Coast
|style="background:#ccffcc;"| 19.14 (128)
|  Fremantle
| 12.8 (80)
| 40,720
|bgcolor="#0014A8" div style="text-align: center;"|
!48
|bgcolor="#0014A8" div style="text-align: center;"|
|- style="background:#fff;font-size: 87%;"
| 23
| rowspan="2" div style="text-align: center;"|2006 
| 6 May
| 6
|style="background:#ccffcc;"|  Fremantle
|style="background:#ccffcc;"| 12.16 (88)
|  West Coast
| 12.11 (83)
| 42,213
|bgcolor="#52007A" div style="text-align: center;"|
!5
|bgcolor="#0014A8" div style="text-align: center;"|
|- style="background:#fff;font-size: 87%;"
| 24
| 27 August
| 21
|  West Coast
| 8.13 (61)
|style="background:#ccffcc;"|  Fremantle
|style="background:#ccffcc;"| 18.10 (118)
|bgcolor="gold"| 43,527
|bgcolor="#52007A" div style="text-align: center;"|
!57
|bgcolor="#0014A8" div style="text-align: center;"|
|- style="background:#fff;font-size: 87%;"
| 25
| rowspan="2" style="text-align: center;"|2007
| 14 April
| 3
|  Fremantle
| 11.4 (70)
|style="background:#ccffcc;"|  West Coast
|style="background:#ccffcc;"| 14.17 (101)
| 42,051
|bgcolor="#0014A8" div style="text-align: center;"|
!31
|bgcolor="#0014A8" div style="text-align: center;"|
|- style="background:#fff;font-size: 87%;"
| 26
| 5 August
| 18
|  West Coast
| 14.13 (97)
|style="background:#ccffcc;"|  Fremantle
|style="background:#ccffcc;"| 19.10 (124)
| 43,096
|bgcolor="#52007A" div style="text-align: center;"|
!27
|bgcolor="#0014A8" div style="text-align: center;"|
|- style="background:#fff;font-size: 87%;"
| 27
| rowspan="2" style="text-align: center;"|2008
| 5 April
| 3
|  West Coast
| 10.13 (73)
|style="background:#ccffcc;"|  Fremantle
|style="background:#ccffcc;"| 12.15 (87)
| 39,027
|bgcolor="#52007A" div style="text-align: center;"|
!14
|bgcolor="#0014A8" div style="text-align: center;"|
|- style="background:#fff;font-size: 87%;"
| 28
| 3 August
| 18
|style="background:#ccffcc;"|  Fremantle
|style="background:#ccffcc;"| 17.14 (116)
|  West Coast
| 12.11 (83)
| 42,096
|bgcolor="#52007A" div style="text-align: center;"|
!33
|bgcolor="#0014A8" div style="text-align: center;"|
|- style="background:#fff;font-size: 87%;"
| 29
| rowspan="2" style="text-align: center;"|2009
| 2 May
| 6
|  West Coast
| 9.20 (74)
|style="background:#ccffcc;"|  Fremantle
|style="background:#ccffcc;"| 13.9 (87)
| 41,654
|bgcolor="#52007A" div style="text-align: center;"|
!13
|bgcolor="#0014A8" div style="text-align: center;"|
|- style="background:#fff;font-size: 87%;"
| 30
| 25 July
| 17
|style="background:#ccffcc;"|  Fremantle
|style="background:#ccffcc;"| 10.11 (71)
|  West Coast
| 8.18 (66)
| 39,536
|bgcolor="#52007A" div style="text-align: center;"|
!5
|bgcolor="#0014A8" div style="text-align: center;"|
|- style="background:#fff;font-size: 87%;"
| 31
| rowspan="2" style="text-align: center;"|2010
| 2 May
| 6
|  West Coast
| 10.13 (73)
|style="background:#ccffcc;"|  Fremantle
|style="background:#ccffcc;"| 17.9 (111)
| 40,886
|bgcolor="#52007A" div style="text-align: center;"|
!38
|bgcolor="#0014A8" div style="text-align: center;"|
|- style="background:#fff;font-size: 87%;"
| 32
| 1 August
| 18
|style="background:#ccffcc;"|  Fremantle
|style="background:#ccffcc;"| 24.16 (160)
|  West Coast
| 13.7 (85)
| 40,451
|bgcolor="#52007A" div style="text-align: center;"|
!75
|bgcolor="#0014A8" div style="text-align: center;"|
|- style="background:#fff;font-size: 87%;"
| 33
| rowspan="2" style="text-align: center;"|2011
| 15 May
| 8
|style="background:#ccffcc;"|  West Coast
|style="background:#ccffcc;"| 14.12 (96)
|  Fremantle
| 9.9 (63)
| 40,567
|bgcolor="#0014A8" div style="text-align: center;"|
!33
|bgcolor="#0014A8" div style="text-align: center;"|
|- style="background:#fff;font-size: 87%;"
| 34
| 24 July
| 18
|  Fremantle
| 9.10 (64)
|style="background:#ccffcc;"|  West Coast
|style="background:#ccffcc;"| 8.17 (65)
| 41,055
|bgcolor="#0014A8" div style="text-align: center;"|
!1
|bgcolor="#0014A8" div style="text-align: center;"|
|- style="background:#fff;font-size: 87%;"
| 35
| rowspan="2" style="text-align: center;"|2012
| 27 May
| 9
|style="background:#ccffcc;"|  West Coast
|style="background:#ccffcc;"| 11.18 (84)
|  Fremantle
| 5.6 (36)
| 40,905
|bgcolor="#0014A8" div style="text-align: center;"|
!48
|bgcolor="#0014A8" div style="text-align: center;"|
|- style="background:#fff;font-size: 87%;"
| 36
| 4 August
| 19
|style="background:#ccffcc;"|  Fremantle
|style="background:#ccffcc;"| 17.11 (113)
|  West Coast
| 6.12 (48)
| 39,694
|bgcolor="#52007A" div style="text-align: center;"|
!65
|bgcolor="#0014A8" div style="text-align: center;"|
|- style="background:#fff;font-size: 87%;"
| 37
| rowspan="2" style="text-align: center;"|2013
| 23 March
| 1
|style="background:#ccffcc;"|  Fremantle
|style="background:#ccffcc;"| 16.12 (108)
|  West Coast
| 11.14 (80)
| 39,629
|bgcolor="#52007A" div style="text-align: center;"|
!28
|bgcolor="#0014A8" div style="text-align: center;"|
|- style="background:#fff;font-size: 87%;"
| 38
| 14 July
| 16
|  West Coast
| 14.9 (93)
|style="background:#ccffcc;"|  Fremantle
|style="background:#ccffcc;"| 19.7 (121)
| 39,839
|bgcolor="#52007A" div style="text-align: center;"|
!28
|bgcolor="#0014A8" div style="text-align: center;"|
|- style="background:#fff;font-size: 87%;"
| 39
| rowspan="2" style="text-align: center;"|2014
| 4 May
| 7
|  West Coast
| 7.12 (54)
|style="background:#ccffcc;"|  Fremantle
|style="background:#ccffcc;"| 11.7 (73)
| 40,476
|bgcolor="#52007A" div style="text-align: center;"|
!19
|bgcolor="#0014A8" div style="text-align: center;"|
|- style="background:#fff;font-size: 87%;"
| 40
| 28 June
| 15
|style="background:#ccffcc;"|  Fremantle
|style="background:#ccffcc;"| 13.10 (88)
|  West Coast
| 11.15 (81)
| 40,490
|bgcolor="#52007A" div style="text-align: center;"|
!7
|bgcolor="#0014A8" div style="text-align: center;"|
|- style="background:#fff;font-size: 87%;"
| 41
| rowspan="2" style="text-align: center;"|2015
| 19 April
| 3
|  West Coast
| 12.9 (81)
|style="background:#ccffcc;"|  Fremantle
|style="background:#ccffcc;"| 17.9 (111)
| 39,138
|bgcolor="#52007A" div style="text-align: center;"|
!30
|bgcolor="#0014A8" div style="text-align: center;"|
|- style="background:#fff;font-size: 87%;"
| 42
| 16 August
| 20
|  Fremantle
| 11.14 (80)
|style="background:#ccffcc;"|  West Coast
|style="background:#ccffcc;"| 15.14 (104)
| 41,959
|bgcolor="#0014A8" div style="text-align: center;"|
!24
|bgcolor="#0014A8" div style="text-align: center;"|
|-style="background:#fff;font-size: 87%;"
|43
|rowspan="2" style="text-align: center;"|2016
|9 April
|3
|style="background:#ccffcc;"|  West Coast
|style="background:#ccffcc;"| 12.20 (92)
| Fremantle
| 8.11 (59)
| 40,555
|bgcolor="#0014A8" div style="text-align: center;"|
!33
|bgcolor="#0014A8" div style="text-align: center;"|
|-style="background:#fff;font-size: 87%;"
|44
|7 August
|20
| Fremantle
|9.10 (64)
|style="background:#ccffcc;"| West Coast
|style="background:#ccffcc;"| 17.8 (110)
| 36,215
|bgcolor="#0014A8" div style="text-align: center;"|
!46
|bgcolor="#0014A8" div style="text-align: center;"|
|- style="background:#fff;font-size: 87%;"
|45
|rowspan="2" style="text-align: center;"|2017
|29 April
|6
|style="background:#ccffcc;"|  West Coast
|style="background:#ccffcc;"| 16.7 (103)
| Fremantle
|9.8 (62)
|40,836
|bgcolor="#0014A8" div style="text-align: center;"|
!41
|bgcolor="#0014A8" div style="text-align: center;"|
|-style="background:#fff;font-size: 87%;"
|46
|16 July
|17
| Fremantle
|5.14 (44)
|style="background:#ccffcc;"| West Coast
|style="background:#ccffcc;"|11.8 (74)
|38,722
|bgcolor="#0014A8" div style="text-align: center;"|
!30
|bgcolor="#0014A8" div style="text-align: center;"|
|- style="background:#fff;font-size: 87%;"
|47
| rowspan="2" div style="text-align: center;"|2018
|29 April
|6
| Fremantle
|12.9 (81)
|style="background:#ccffcc;"| West Coast
|style="background:#ccffcc;"|13.11 (89)
| rowspan="9"| Perth Stadium
|56,521
|bgcolor="#0014A8" div style="text-align: center;"| 
!8
|bgcolor="#0014A8" div style="text-align: center;"|
|- style="background:#fff;font-size: 87%;"
|48
|5 August
|20
|style="background:#ccffcc;"| West Coast
|style="background:#ccffcc;"|21.16 (142)
| Fremantle
|13.6 (84)
| 57,375
|bgcolor="#0014A8" div style="text-align: center;"| 
!58
|bgcolor="#0014A8" div style="text-align: center;"|
|- style="background:#fff;font-size: 87%;"
|49
|rowspan="2" style="text-align: center;"|2019
|13 April
|4
|style="background:#ccffcc";| West Coast
|style="background:#ccffcc;"|10.9 (69)
| Fremantle
|7.14 (56)
|bgcolor="gold"|58,219
|bgcolor="#0014A8" div style="text-align: center;"| 
!13
|bgcolor="#0014A8" div style="text-align: center;"|
|- style="background:#fff;font-size: 87%;"
|50
|6 July
|16
| Fremantle
|2.19 (31)
|style="background:#ccffcc";| West Coast
|style="background:#ccffcc;"|19.8 (122)
|56,358
|bgcolor="#0014A8" div style="text-align: center;"| 
!91
|bgcolor="#0014A8" div style="text-align: center;"|
|- style="background:#fff;font-size: 87%;"
|51
| style="text-align: center;"|2020
| 19 July
| 7
|  Fremantle
|5.2 (32)
|style="background:#ccffcc";| West Coast
|style="background:#ccffcc;"|9.8 (62)
|25,306
|bgcolor="#0014A8" div style="text-align: center;"| 
!30
|bgcolor="#0014A8" div style="text-align: center;"|
|- style="background:#fff;font-size: 87%;"
|52
|rowspan="2" style="text-align: center;"|2021
|2 May
|7
|style="background:#ccffcc";| West Coast
|style="background:#ccffcc;"|20.12 (132)
| Fremantle
|11.7 (73)
|0
|bgcolor="#0014A8" div style="text-align: center;"| 
!59
|bgcolor="#0014A8" div style="text-align: center;"|
|- style="background:#fff;font-size: 87%;"
|53
|15 August
|22
|style="background:#ccffcc;"| Fremantle
|style="background:#ccffcc;"|12.7 (79)
| West Coast
|9.10 (64)
|51,692
|bgcolor="#52007A" div style="text-align: center;"|
!15
|bgcolor="#0014A8" div style="text-align: center;"|
|- style="background:#fff;font-size: 87%;"

|54
|rowspan="2" style="text-align: center;"|2022
| 3 April
| 3

| West Coast
|7.5 (47)

|style="background:#ccffcc";|  Fremantle
|style="background:#ccffcc";| 15.12 (102)

|38,920
|bgcolor="#52007A" div style="text-align: center;"|
!55
|bgcolor="#0014A8" div style="text-align: center;"|

|- style="background:#fff;font-size: 87%;"

|55
| 13 August
| 22

|style="background:#ccffcc";|  Fremantle
|style="background:#ccffcc";| 9.17 (71)

| West Coast
|7.5 (47)

|53,826
|bgcolor="#52007A" div style="text-align: center;"|
!24
|bgcolor="#0014A8" div style="text-align: center;"|

|- style="background:#fff;font-size: 87%;"

Women's Western Derby results

|- style="background:#ccf;font-size: 87%"
| 
| Year
| Date
| 
| Home Team
| 
| Away Team
| 
| Ground
| width=45 | Crowd
| Winner
|
||
|- style="background:#fff;font-size: 87%;"
| 1
| 2020
| 15 February 
| 2
|  West Coast
| 2.3 (15)
| style="background:#ccffcc;"|  Fremantle
| style="background:#ccffcc;"| 9.6 (60)
| Optus Stadium
|bgcolor="gold"| 35,185
| bgcolor="#52007A" div style="text-align: center;"|
! 47
| bgcolor="#52007A" div style="text-align: center;"|
|- style="background:#fff;font-size: 87%;"
| 2
|rowspan=2| 2021
| 7 February 
| 2
| style="background:#ccffcc;"|  Fremantle
| style="background:#ccffcc;"| 2.11 (23)
|  West Coast
| 2.2 (14)
| Fremantle Oval
| 0
| bgcolor="#52007A" div style="text-align: center;"|
! 9
| bgcolor="#52007A" div style="text-align: center;"|
|- style="background:#fff;font-size: 87%;"
| 3
| 7 March 
| 6
|  West Coast
| 1.2 (8)
| style="background:#ccffcc;"|  Fremantle
| style="background:#ccffcc;"| 11.9 (75)
| Optus Stadium
| 7,469
| bgcolor="#52007A" div style="text-align: center;"|
| bgcolor="gold"| 68
| bgcolor="#52007A" div style="text-align: center;"|
|- style="background:#fff;font-size: 87%;"
| 4
| 2022
| 8 January
| 1
| style="background:#ccffcc;"|  Fremantle
| style="background:#ccffcc;"| 6.7 (43)
|  West Coast
| 2.3 (15)
| Fremantle Oval
| 5,533
| bgcolor="#52007A" div style="text-align: center;"|
! 28
| bgcolor="#52007A" div style="text-align: center;"|
|}

Best on ground winners

Timeline of results

Statistics

Up-to-date at the completion of Derby 53

Most Goals in One Game

Most Career Goals

Games played

Brownlow Votes 
Brownlow Votes through the end of the 2020 AFL season.

Other Western Derbys

AFL Women's 
In preparation for the 2017 launch of the AFL women's league competition, the AFL held 10 Exhibition Series matches during 2016. The only match held in Perth featured both a women's side from the Fremantle Football Club & the West Coast Eagles, played as a curtain-raiser for the men's Western Derby, won by the West Coast Eagles.
The First Western Derby in the AFLW took place on 15 February 2020, when the West Coast Eagles lost to the Fremantle Dockers at Optus Stadium.

Notes 
aFor the 2020 season only, there was only one Western Derby due to the premiership season being shortened to 17 rounds as a result of the COVID-19 pandemic in Australia.
bDue to a local transmission of COVID-19 in Western Australia in early 2021, the two Perth-based AFLW teams were forced to isolate as part of a five-day lockdown in Perth, rather than travelling to South Australia for their scheduled matches. The AFL instead fixtured a derby between the two sides, held without general public access.
cDue to a local transmission of COVID-19 in Western Australia in May 2021, a decision was made by Western Australia premier Mark McGowan to ban spectators from attending the match only hours before the first bounce.
dA second Western Derby was scheduled for the two clubs due to WA's border restrictions precluding travel to and from Victoria, and to allow fans to attend after the first Derby in round two was played behind closed doors.

See also
 Showdown: The AFL Intrastate Derby of South Australia, first played in 1997. (Adelaide Crows Vs. Port Adelaide Power).
 QClash: The AFL intrastate Derby of Queensland, first played in 2011. (Brisbane Lions Vs. Gold Coast Suns)
 Sydney Derby: The AFL Intrastate Derby of New South Wales, first played in 2012. (Sydney Swans Vs. Greater Western Sydney Giants).

References

External link

Australian Football League games
Australian Football League rivalries
Fremantle Football Club
West Coast Eagles
Australian rules football in Western Australia